Pražmo is a municipality and village in Frýdek-Místek District in the Moravian-Silesian Region of the Czech Republic. It has about 900 inhabitants.

Geography
Pražmo lies in the historical region of Cieszyn Silesia. The municipality is mostly located in the Moravian-Silesian Beskids, the northern part is located in the Moravian-Silesian Foothills. It is situated between the Morávka and Mohelnice rivers near their confluence, but none of this rivers flows through the municipal territory.

History
Pražmo was established in between Raškovice and Morávka in 1777 of the initiative of the owner of the Friedek state country, Jan Nepomuk of Pražma, hence the name of the village.

After World War I and fall of Austria-Hungary it became a part of Czechoslovakia. In March 1939 it became a part of Protectorate of Bohemia and Moravia. After World War II it was restored to Czechoslovakia.

Sights
The landmark of Pražmo is the Church of Saint John of Nepomuk. It was built in 1807–1817.

Twin towns – sister cities

Pražmo is twinned with:
 Niemodlin, Poland

References

External links

 

Villages in Frýdek-Místek District
Cieszyn Silesia